The Turbomeca Bastan was a turboprop engine developed in France in 1957. Early models developed 650 shp (485 kW), but by 1965 this had been increased to 1,048 shp (780 kW) with the Bastan VII.

Flight tests of some Bastan models were carried out using a Lockheed Constellation flying test bed. The engine's principal applications were the Aérospatiale N 262 (Nord 262) and Nord 260 airliners.

The Bastan was also developed into the Turbomeca Aubisque turbofan.

Applications
 Aérospatiale N 262
 FMA IA 50 Guaraní II
 Nord 260
 Sud Aviation SE.116 Voltigeur
 Sud Aviation SE.117 Voltigeur

Variants
Bastan IV
Bastan VI
Bastan VIA1
Bastan VIB1
Bastan VIB2
Bastan VIC
Bastan VIC1
Bastan VII
Bastan 16
Bastafan
Bi-Bastan IV A paired Bastan IV developed for French-modified Sikorsky S-58 helicopters. De-rated to

Specifications (Bastan VIC)

See also

References

 

Bastan
1950s turboprop engines